Pierre Michel (born 16 November 1929) is a French cyclist. He competed in the 4,000 metres team pursuit event at the 1952 Summer Olympics.

References

External links
 

1929 births
Living people
French male cyclists
Olympic cyclists of France
Cyclists at the 1952 Summer Olympics
Sportspeople from Calvados (department)
French track cyclists
Cyclists from Normandy